Paul Flack American is a former slalom canoeist who competed from the late 1970s to the early 1980s. He won a bronze medal in the C-2 team event at the 1981 ICF Canoe Slalom World Championships in Bala.

References

Year of birth missing (living people)
Living people
American male canoeists
Medalists at the ICF Canoe Slalom World Championships